Heterosperma is a genus of flowering plants in the sunflower family, native to North and South America.

 Species
 Heterosperma achaetum S.F.Blake - Colombia
 Heterosperma diversifolium Kunth - Bolivia, Peru, Argentina, Ecuador
 Heterosperma nanum (Nutt.) Sherff - Bolivia, Peru, Argentina, Chile
 Heterosperma ovatifolium Cav. - Bolivia, Peru, Argentina, Chile
 Heterosperma pinnatum Cav. - Mesoamerica, United States (Arizona, New Mexico, Texas, Colorado), Bolivia, Venezuela
 Heterosperma tenuisectum (Griseb.) Cabrera - Bolivia, Peru, Argentina
 Heterosperma xanti A.Gray - Mexico (Baja California Sur)

References

Asteraceae genera
Coreopsideae
Taxa named by Antonio José Cavanilles